Päivä on nuori is the second solo studio album by a Finnish reggae artist Raappana. Released on 3 October 2007, the album peaked at number 18 on the Finnish Albums Chart.

Track listing

Chart performance

References

2007 debut albums
Raappana (musician) albums